Theileriidae is a family of parasites in the order Piroplasmida. It includes the genus Theileria.

References 

Piroplasmida
Apicomplexa families